Reynolds Field is a 1,500-seat multi-purpose stadium in Roseville, Minnesota, United States. It is home to the University of Northwestern – St. Paul Eagles.  The facility was dedicated in honor of long-time coach Chub Reynolds in September 1990. The stadium was rebuilt in 2014.

Buildings and structures in Roseville, Minnesota
College football venues
American football venues in Minnesota
Soccer venues in Minnesota
College lacrosse venues in the United States
Northwestern Eagles